Elizabeth Hilden (born November 4, 1973) is an American adult model.

Career
She made her debut as an adult model for Penthouse as their Pet of the Month in June 1995 and went on to be voted Penthouse Pet of the Year for 1997. As a Penthouse Pet, she was featured in a variety of Penthouse publications and videos. Hilden not only appeared in several "Penthouse" videos, but also was featured in such men's magazines as "Taboo," "High Society," "Leg World," and "D-cup." Moreover, Hilden posed for soft-core photo shoots for noted glamor photographer Suze Randall which included some leg fetish material.

She made a professional wrestling appearance in 1996 when she appeared as Hunter Hearst Helmsley's valet during the In Your House 6 event.

Other ventures
After finishing her modeling responsibilities for Penthouse, Hilden moved back to Missouri and started her own business. She owns a tattoo and piercing parlor called "Purgatory Tattoos" in her hometown of Independence. The business features a 35-foot school bus that was converted into a mobile tattoo shop and is taken to Sturgis, South Dakota every year for the annual motorcycle rally.

Personal life
Hilden is a motorcycle enthusiast.

References

External links
 
 

Penthouse Pets of the Year
American female adult models
Living people
Penthouse Pets
1969 births
21st-century American women